Baron Monk Bretton, of Conyboro and Hurstpierpoint in the County of Sussex, is a title in the Peerage of the United Kingdom. It was created by letters patent on 4 November 1884 for the Liberal politician John George Dodson. He was succeeded by his son, the second Baron. He was notably chairman of the London County Council from 1929 to 1930.  the title is held by the latter's grandson, the fourth Baron, who succeeded his father in that year.

The judge Sir John Dodson was the father of the first Baron.

Barons Monk Bretton (1884)
John George Dodson, 1st Baron Monk Bretton (1825–1897)
John William Dodson, 2nd Baron Monk Bretton (1869–1933)
John Charles Dodson, 3rd Baron Monk Bretton (1924–2022)
Christopher Mark Dodson, 4th Baron Monk Bretton (b. 1958)

The heir apparent is his elder son, Hon. Benjamin Charles Dodson (b. 1989)

Notes

References

The General Armory of England, Scotland, Ireland and Wales; comprising a registry of armorial bearings from the earliest to the present time, by Sir Bernard Burke, C.B., LL.D., Ulster King of Arms, London, Harrison, 59, Pall Mall, 1884.

Baronies in the Peerage of the United Kingdom
Noble titles created in 1884
Noble titles created for UK MPs